The 1996 Ottawa Rough Riders finished 4th place in the East Division with a 3–15 record and failed to make the playoffs. This was the final season in Ottawa Rough Riders franchise history as they folded after the season ended. Jim Gilstrap was the coach through the second game of the regular season before being fired and replaced with John Payne for the remainder of the season.

Offseason

CFL draft

Preseason

Final standings

Season standings

Regular season

Schedule

Awards and honours

CFL All-Stars
 WR – Joseph Rogers, CFL All-Star

Eastern All-Stars
 WR – Joseph Rogers, CFL Eastern All-Star
 LB – Lamar McGriggs, CFL Eastern All-Star
 DB – Kenny Wilhite, CFL Eastern All-Star

References

Ottawa Rough Riders seasons